John Charles Hunt (27 June 1856 – 23 March 1930) was an Australian politician and a member of the New South Wales Legislative Assembly for 13 years.

Early life
Hunt was born in Dural, New South Wales, the son of George Thomas Hunt, orchardist, and Elizabeth Williams. He attended Parramatta North Public School and Newington College whilst the school was situated at Newington House on the Parramatta River.

Career
Commissioned as a Justice of the Peace in 1892, Hunt was an orchardist and grazier. After school he joined his father as an orchardist in Dural and on his father's death he moved to Parramatta and became a member of Hunt Brothers Limited. He owned Burdenda Station on the Bogan River. In 1907, Hunt was the president of the Castle Hill Agricultural and Horticultural Association and vice president of Fruitgrowers' Union. He was a member of Carlingford-Dural Railway League in 1903 and was a Councillor of Hornsby Shire from 1906 until 1908 serving as President in his first two years.

At the 1907 election Hunt was elected to the Legislative Assembly as the Liberal member for Sherbrooke. When the district was abolished in 1913 he was elected as the member for Camden. He retired at the 1920 election and did not hold party, parliamentary or ministerial office.

Hunt died at Parramatta on 23 March 1930.

References

 

1856 births
1930 deaths
Members of the New South Wales Legislative Assembly
People educated at Newington College
People from Parramatta
Australian Methodists
Nationalist Party of Australia members of the Parliament of New South Wales
Shire Presidents and Mayors of Hornsby